Riffians or Rifians (singular:) are a Berber ethnic group originally from the Rif region of northeastern Morocco (includes the autonomous city of Spain, Melilla). Communities of Riffian immigrants are also found in southern Spain, Netherlands and Belgium as well as elsewhere in Western Europe. They are overwhelmingly Sunni Muslims, but retain their pre-Islamic traditions such as high status for Riffian women.

According to Irina Casado i Aijon, Riffians have traditionally organized themselves under "patrilineality and patrilocality principles". The oldest man in the household commands authority and responsibility for decisions, while women jointly care for the young and sick without any discrimination. Like other Berbers, temporary migration is an accepted tradition. The Riffians have been a significant source of Moroccan emigrants into some European countries such as the Netherlands, Belgium and Germany.

Riffians speak Tarifit, which belongs to the Zenati group of Berber languages. The languages spoken depend on the region, with many Riffians who speak a Berber language also speaking Moroccan Arabic or Spanish. Nineteen groups or social units of Riffians are known: five in the west along the Mediterranean coast which speak Riffian and Moroccan Arabic, seven in the centre of which one speaks mainly Moroccan Arabic and rest Riffian, five in the east and two in the southeastern desert area also speak the Riffian language.

They have inhabited an impoverished and an eroded, deforested, poorly irrigated region. Poverty rate and infant mortality rates among Riffians has been high, according to a study published in 1980 by Terri Joseph. The Riffians have lived a largely settled, agricultural lifestyle, using hand tools, oxen and cattle to plow the steeply terraced land in their valleys. Horticultural produce along with sheep and goat meat, cheese, and milk provide the traditional sustenance. Some practice sardine-seining along the Mediterranean coast.

Riffians have experienced numerous wars over their history. Some of their cultural traditions reflects and remembers this history, such as the singing and dancing of Ayara Liyara, Ayara Labuya, which literally means "Oh Lady oh Lady, oh Lady Buya" and is accompanied by izran (couplets) and addjun (tambourine tapping). This tradition, states Hsain Ilahiane, is linked to the 11th-century destruction and deaths of the Riffian fathers during the raid by the Almoravid leader Yusuf ibn Tashfin. In more modern times, the Rif War caused numerous deaths of Riffian people and of Spanish as well as French soldiers. The Rif War witnessed the use of chemical weapons in the 1920s by the Spanish army.

In 1958, some Riffians revolted against the government. In the decades that followed, the Rif region has witnessed popular demonstrations and demands for better education, healthcare and job opportunities. A resurgent Riffian popular movement in 2010, their protests in 2013 and protests in 2017 for hogra – a humiliating treatment by an abusive state, has drawn public attention, as well as claims of brutal suppression by Moroccan authorities.

Tribes and tribal groups
The Rifians are divided into these tribes and tribal groups:

 Ait Ammart
 Ait Touzine
 Ait Waryagher
 Ait Boufrah
 Mestassa
 Metiwa
 Targuist
 Ait Stout (Arabic speaking)
 Ait Bouyahyi
 Ait Said
 Ait Tourich
 Ait Itteft
 Igzenayen
 Ibdarsen
 Ibaqouyen
 Ikebdanen
 Iqer'iyen
 Ait Tafarsite
 Ait Temsamane

People of Rifian descent

 Anwar Elyounoussi
 M'hamed Ababou
 Mohamed Ababou
 Ahmed Aboutaleb
 Ibrahim Afellay
 Selim Amallah
 Mohamed Amekrane
 Sellam Amezian
 Mohammed Ameziane
 Nordin Amrabat
 Sofyan Amrabat
 Oussama Assaidi
 Mohamed Aujjar
 Jamal Ben Saddik
 Mohamed Choukri
 Najat El Hachmi
 Munir El Haddadi
 Mounir El Hamdaoui
 Ilyas El Omari
 Omar Elabdellaoui
 Mohamed ibn Abdelkrim El-Khattabi 
 El Mortada Iamrachen
 Mohamed Ihattaren
 Khalid Izri
 Abdelouafi Laftit
 Ali Lmrabet
 Ahmed Marcouch
 Mohamed Medbouh
 Munir Mohamedi
 Achraf Ouchen
 Adel Taarabt
 Driss Temsamani
 Najat Vallaud-Belkacem
 Nasser Zefzafi
 Mohammed Ziane
 Salima Ziani

See also
Ghomara language.
Senhaja de Srair language.
Senhaja de Srair in Central Rif.
Ghomara in Western Rif.
Jbala in Western Rif.
 Beni Iznasen in Eastern Rif.
  Beni Snous Tlemcen, Western Algeria.

References

External links

Berber peoples and tribes
Berbers in Morocco
Indigenous peoples of North Africa
Ethnic groups in Morocco
Muslim communities in Africa